Sheila Kavugwe Chajira (born December 20, 1993) is a female Kenyan rugby sevens player. She competed at the 2016 Summer Olympics as a member of the Kenyan women's national rugby sevens team. She played at the 2016 France Women's Sevens.

References

External links 
 
 
 Sheila Chajira at ShujaaPride.com

1993 births
Living people
Female rugby sevens players
Rugby sevens players at the 2016 Summer Olympics
Olympic rugby sevens players of Kenya
Kenya international rugby sevens players
Rugby sevens players at the 2020 Summer Olympics
Kenya international women's rugby sevens players